My Brother's Wedding is a tragicomic film edited, written, produced, and directed by Charles Burnett. Set in South Central Los Angeles, the film follows Pierce Mundy (Everett Silas) who finds himself torn between incompatible loyalties after his childhood friend, Soldier (Ronnie Bell), is released from prison.

Although the film is today praised for its tender, funny and moving portrayal of contemporary working class African American life, mishandling of the film's promotion by the producers led to a limited release of only a rough edit of the film to mixed reviews in 1983. Burnett was able to finish editing and re-release the film in 2007 to a positive critical response, although the film's theatrical run would gross less than $10,000.

Plot

The movie opens with a man playing the harmonica and singing the blues. Pierce is then seen walking down the street when he gets called by a woman to see her sister's baby. Pierce says that he doesn't have time because he has to go to visit Soldier's mother, but goes in anyway. At the house, Pierce asks who the father is and the woman says that he could be the father if he wants. Angered by the comment, Pierce leaves the house and continues his way to Soldier's place.

At the house, Soldier's mother Mrs. Richardson asks Pierce if Soldier will ever act his age and wants Pierce to keep him out of trouble. Pierce says that Soldier wrote him a letter that said he would never go back to jail and even asked for a job. Mrs. Richardson asks about his brother's wedding and Pierce tells her he doesn't like the fiancée because she's rich. Pierce leaves saying that he has to work at his mother's shop.

At the shop, Mr. Bitterfield comes in asking if Pierce's mother, Mrs. Mundy, can mend the rip in his church-going pants. When Pierce goes in the back to consult his mother, she says to tell Mr. Bitterfield that they can fix them but to instead throw them in the trash and, when Mr. Bitterfield comes to pick them up, to give him a pair from the unclaimed box. Pierce then gets into a wrestling match with his father. Meanwhile, a man comes into the store asking for a job. Mrs. Mundy replies saying there are two grown men in the back that can help her. Turning around to see Pierce and his father still wrestling, the man leaves, as do Pierce's parents.

Back at home, Pierce's mother informs him that his brother and his fiancée are coming over. Pierce says he does not want to go to the wedding, complaining that Sonia is always bragging about how her family is rich and privileged. She warns Pierce that he has to behave so Sonia can see that he is civilized. She then tells him to go over to the neighborhood elders, Big Momma and Big Daddy, to see if they need anything and to pick up a pot. Once there, Big Daddy gets mad at Pierce for being rude and not saying anything. Pierce explains that he has to get back to the house before Wendell gets there.

Pierce and Sonia get into an argument because Pierce thinks that Sonia had nothing to worry about all her life because she attended charm school. Sonia retaliates saying that she had to worry about things such as grades and if people liked her. Sonia also says that charm school taught young girls how to be ladies. They walk into the living room, where Wendell was telling his secretary of the wedding count. Upon hearing that, Pierce's mother then turns and asks Pierce when he's going to have a secretary. She says that she put them in church so that when they settled down she would have done her job, implying that Pierce has not yet accomplished anything Pierce tells his mother that it is not his fault. This upsets his mother as she tells him that it is because of the sacrifices of her and his.

The next day, a man comes in looking for the clothes that he had brought in two months ago. They have trouble finding it because they man does not remember what he put his name as. They allow the man to go back and look for it, but Mrs. Mundy states that if he was a good man they would not have to keep track of all his aliases. Angela comes into the store all dressed up asking Pierce if he would go to prom with her in a couple of years. Seeing Pierce's disinterest, she leaves saying that she's going over to Smokey Robinson's tonight and that she should go get dressed. Pierce's mother tells him that he needs to go over to Big Momma and Daddy's house because Haddie wants to go out. As Pierce leaves, he and his father get into another wrestling match.

With Soldier close to returning home, Pierce goes to a liquor store and asks his friend if he would be willing to give Soldier a job. The friend says that he would give Pierce a job, but he will not give one to Soldier. Having been rejected, Pierce then goes to ask his friend, Bob, telling him that Soldier is getting out of jail. Bob states that it is too bad because a person like Soldier should just stay in jail until he rots. Hearing this, Pierce leaves without even asking and picks up Soldier to take him home. When Mrs. Richardson sees Soldier she starts crying and Pierce consoles her saying that he is here to stay.

Pierce hangs out with Soldier saying that Soldier is with a different girl every time he sees him. They goof around and hang out for the day. While hanging out in an alley, Soldier asks about his friend Lonneil and Pierce tells him that he was killed during an attempt to rob a liquor store. Pierce then says that they are the only two left. The next day Angela comes back and tells Pierce about how she was at Smokey Robinson's last night. She also tells him she does not like guys that are too cute. Pierce's mom interrupts, telling him that he has to go take care of Big Daddy and give him a bath. A man then attempts to rob the shop but backs out when he realized that Mrs. Mundy was on to what he was trying to do. Soldier asks Pierce about his girlfriend, Barbara, and if they had sex or not. Someone hiding in the bushes then leaps out and tries to shoot them but there are no bullets in the gun. They end up chasing the man, but Pierce lets him go.

Pierce's mother begs him not to embarrass the family during dinner with the Richardson's. She says that she didn't raise heathens, but Pierce still states that he does not like Sonia because she has never worked for anything in her life. During dinner, Mr. Richardson asks Pierce what his job is. Pierce says that he went to school but did not like that everyone was doing the same thing. He tells him how he used to drive heavy machinery and delivered explosives. He states that he likes to work with his hands and that he's not smart enough to become a lawyer. Pierce's mother then says that it would have been nice to have a doctor and a lawyer in the family, but Pierce remarks that they are all crooks. Mr. Richardson says that the real corruption is in politics. Pierce states that the higher up you go, the lower the people you find. When Pierce's mother asks Sonia about her trial, Pierce yells at her saying that letting her client go free was wrong because he had killed people. This ends the dinner and they leave with Pierce's mother saying how ashamed of him she is.

While Pierce is working at the store, Soldier walks in with a girl and asks Pierce to let him have sex with the girl in the back. Pierce's mother goes to church but comes back because she forgot her prayer book. She ends up walking in on them having sex and freaks out because they also did it on her prayer book. The girl then runs away in embarrassment. The next day, Soldier is waiting in a car for Pierce with another girl and sends Angela to go tell Pierce to hurry up. Angela ends up not telling Pierce that they are waiting and they leave without him.

While Pierce is taking care of Big Momma and Big Daddy, Big Daddy asks Pierce if his friends are saved and believe in God, especially Soldier. That night Soldier gets into a car accident and dies. When Pierce finds out the next day, he runs to Soldier's house where his parents are grieving and the funeral is set for Saturday. Soldier's mom tells Pierce that he was like a son to her. Pierce then feels like it is his job to find pallbearers. In doing so, he realizes that the funeral is the same day as his brother's wedding. He rushes home to ask his brother and Sonia to change they date, but they refuse because he had never been nice to Sonia. Pierce's father then talks to him and tells them that maybe they can change the date of the funeral. With new hope, Pierce goes back to Soldier's house to ask. Once there, Soldier's dad tells him about the stress of the last few days and all the relatives that have flown in for Soldier's funeral. Hearing this, Pierce abandons the idea of asking them to change the date of the funeral and is now left conflicted. As both the wedding and the funeral are starting, Pierce shows up late and tells his mother that he has to go to the funeral. He tells his mother that someone else has to be the best man, but she gets angry and tells him to go sit down. However, Pierce ends up getting a car and drives to Soldier's funeral only to be late and miss it. The movie ends with Pierce sitting at the parking lot of the mortuary with the wedding rings and missing both events.

Characters 
 Pierce Mundy (Everett Silas) - main character who is a man with no ambitions and spends his days working at his parents' dry cleaners in South Central Los Angeles. When he is not working, he is either taking care of the neighborhood elders or wasting time with his childhood friend, Soldier. When the time comes for Pierce to make a crucial decision in his life, he is not morally able to choose the right decision and ends up disappointing his family.
 Wendell Mundy (Monte Easter) - Pierce's brother who is also a lawyer moving up in the social class order. He is about to marry an upper-middle class woman who Pierce despises because she is wealthier than their family.
 Mrs. Mundy (Jessie Holms) - Pierce's mother who dominates the household and manages the dry cleaners store. She is always nagging Pierce to get an education and become successful like his brother. She is very proud of her son, Wendell, and is constantly trying to get Pierce to be just like him.
 Mr. Mundy (Dennis Kemper) - Pierce's father who is very passive and has no major responsibilities in his life. Similar to Pierce, he acts like a child wrestling and fighting with Pierce. He has no influence over his family and cannot even help Pierce make the right decision in life.
 Soldier Richardson (Ronnie Bell) - Pierce's childhood friend who is constantly in and out of prison. He does not have a job and spends his days fooling around and sleeping with multiple women. He influences Pierce to make the wrong decisions in life and gets them in trouble.
 Mrs. Richardson (Sally Easter) - Soldier's mother who looks to Pierce to try to help Soldier become a better person. She sees Pierce as her own son and hopes he can lead Soldier to make the right decisions.
 Sonia Dubois (Gaye Shannon-Burnett) - Wendell's fiancé who Pierce hates because he thinks that she never had to work for anything in her entire life. She and Pierce constantly get into argument about the subject and refuses to change her wedding date because Pierce had never been nice to her.
 Mr. and Mrs. Dubois (Sy Richardson and Frances E, Nealy )- Sonia's parents who are very wealthy and despised by Pierce.
 Angela (Angela Burnett) - neighborhood girl that has a crush on Pierce and is always trying to talk to him.

History
Charles Burnett calls this movie a tragicomedy based on the lives of the people who live in South Central Los Angeles. In a place where crime and violence are such a big part of everyday life and most people are stuck in their life, Burnett shows the life of an average person through the life of Pierce.  
He spends his days either wasting time with his friends or working a dead end job at his parents' dry cleaners with no thoughts of ever leaving. Burnett also depicts a typical household of dominant mothers and passive father as seen in Pierce's parents.
Burnett's tragicomedy shows the life of African-American living in the working class communities as funny and loving, though impoverished.
As a statement in the New York Times states "[Burnett is] making art out of materials and inspirations that lie close to hand. And the result is a film that is so firmly and organically rooted in a specific time and place that it seems to contain worlds.”

Production
Charles Burnett was not allowed to finish editing the movie before it was sent to a New York film festival for screening by the producers. The rough-cut version of the film screened at the festival initially received a mixed review in The New York Times.
This scared off distributors who  believed it would be unsuccessful and the film was therefore never released to wider public audiences. Armond White, a film critic, commented that this was “a catastrophic blow to the development of American popular culture.”  Almost twenty five years later when Milestone Films picked up the rights to the film, Burnett was able to finish editing and re-release the film.

Release

Box office
My Brother's Wedding generated $4,294 in revenue during its first weekend on September 16, 2007. The film was screened in only one theater in the U.S. The film went on to earn gross revenue of $8,217.

Critical reception
Upon release of the re-edited film, it received mostly positive reviews. Slant Magazine called this film timeless and necessary even though it did not hold up well as Burnett's first film, Killer of Sheep.   
The Village Voice stated it was "A treasure that demands to be unearthed in all its funny-sad tenderness." Jonathan Rosenbaum of the Chicago Reader said "If a better film has been made about black ghetto life, I haven't seen it."

References

External links
 
 
 
 
 

1983 films
1983 comedy-drama films
African-American films
American independent films
1980s English-language films
Films directed by Charles Burnett (director)
1980s American films